Gaming or gambling is a permitted activity in Mexico, subject to the obtaining of the corresponding governmental authorization to conduct gaming activities from the Mexican competent authority.  Gambling is an activity subject to scope or attributions of the federal government and legislation, and not to those of a state or local level; with the exception of gaming tax issues.

Pursuant to Section X of Article 73 of the Constitution of Mexico, the Federal Legislature enacted the Federal Games and Draws Law (Ley Federal de Juegos y Sorteos), which was published in the Official Gazette of the Federation (Diario Oficial de la Federación) on December 31, 1947 and is in effect since January 5, 1948.

A new gambling legislation is in the process of being created in Mexico by the gambling regulatory body of Mexico the NM Gaming Control Board. The gambling legislation of Mexico was last amended in 2004 and doesn't address internet gambling at all.

Bingo can only be conducted for fundraising purposes by eligible charitable organizations according to The Bingo and Raffle Act of Mexico.

The legal gambling age is 18.

References

 
Entertainment in Mexico